SNCF's X 2400 are a class of railcars. The 79 XABDP 2400, unifiés  were built from 1951 to 1955. The railcars were often coupled to trailers of coupled to other units.

The class was put into service along the X 3800, Picasso. These  railcars facilitated the phasing out of steam traction and to renew aging railcar stock. The class was first allocated to Limoges and onto the lines of the Massif Central, coupled to XR 8000 trailers. The X 2400 was quickly accompanied by the X 2800 railcars, equipped with one engine only, but more powerful.

The maintenance cost of the X 2400 was greater than the one-engined X 2800 and so the class was moved to Rennes. The arrival of the X 2100 and X 2200 railcars precipitated the retirement of the X 2400, the last 2400 retiring in 1989.

The X 2464 was withdrawn from service in 1988 and was modified into a measurement train. It was painted into the Corail livery of dark grey, orange and white. Twelve railcars have been preserved.

Two sub-classes of X 2400 exist:

X 2400 in preservation

 X 2402: at Les Hôpitaux-Neufs, CFT Pontarlier-Vallorbe
 X 2403: at Bort-les-Orgues - Neussargues, ACFHA
 X 2416: at Carhaix-Plouguer, CFTA
 X 2419: at Vendôme, CFT vallée du Loir
 X 2423: at Loudéac Chemin de Fer du Centre Bretagne
 X 2425: at Estivareilles, Chemin de fer du Haut-Forez
 X 2426: at Pont-Audemer, PontAuRail
 X 2429: at Carhaix-Plouguer, CFTA
 X 2448: at Saint-Amand-les-Eaux, AAMCS
 X 2464: still with the SNCF as measurement train
 X 2468: at Attigny, CFT Sud des Ardennes
 X 2475: at Saint-Étienne (museum)

References 

2400
Train-related introductions in 1951
1951 in rail transport
Diesel multiple units of France